Henry James Fowler, MBE (10 December 1926 – 4 January 2012) was an English character actor in film and television. Over a career lasting more than six decades, he made nearly 200 appearances on screen.

Personal life
Fowler was born in Lambeth, South London, on 10 December 1926. As a "near illiterate newspaper boy" making eight shillings a week, he told film historian Brian McFarlane, he was invited on to radio to speak about his life in wartime London.

In 1951, Fowler married actress Joan Dowling, who committed suicide in 1954. In 1960, he married Catherine Palmer, who survived him.

Fowler died on 4 January 2012.  He had no children.

Career
Fowler made his on-screen debut as Ern in the 1942 film Those Kids from Town, a propaganda piece about wartime evacuee children from London. This role was given to him after film company executives heard him speaking on the radio about his experiences in wartime London. After a screen test at Elstree Studios, Fowler was given the part to star alongside George Cole. His fee was 2 guineas (42 shillings) a day, compared with the 8 shillings a week he had been earning as a newspaper boy up to his audition.

His early juvenile roles included Hue and Cry (1947), usually considered the first of the Ealing comedies. Fowler later married Joan Dowling, one of his co-stars in the Ealing film. Dowling committed suicide in 1954, aged 26.

During the Second World War, he served as an aircraftman in the Royal Air Force and played a cheerful cockney character with the same job in the films Angels One Five (1952), and Conflict of Wings (1954),  a portrayal he used in other contexts, often with a humorous slant, mostly especially during his year in The Army Game (1959–60) TV series.

He played Harry Danvers in the clerical comedy Our Man at St. Mark's (1965–66) opposite Donald Sinden and made several appearances on children's television during the 1970s, reading on Jackanory and hosting the series Get This and Going a Bundle with Kenny Lynch. He is also noted for having narrated Bob Godfrey Films' Great: Isambard Kingdom Brunel (1975), the first British cartoon to win an Academy Award. His familiar voice was regularly used for TV commercials.

In 1975, Fowler took the part of Eric Lee Fung, described as "a Chinese cockney spiv", in The Melting Pot, a sitcom written by Spike Milligan and Neil Shand. The series was cancelled by the BBC after the first episode had been broadcast.

He was awarded an MBE in 1970, as part of Harold Wilson's Resignation Honours.

In his book British Film Character Actors 1982, Terence Pettigrew wrote that Fowler 'was as English as suet pudding...his characters were neither honest nor irretrievably delinquent, merely wise in the ways of the streets, surviving through a combination of wit and stealth. He had a certain arrogance, but there was an appealing vulnerability, too.'

Selected filmography

 Those Kids from Town  (1942) – Ern
 Salute John Citizen (1942) – Office Boy (uncredited)
 Went the Day Well? (1942) – Young George
 Get Cracking (1943) – (uncredited)
 The Demi-Paradise (1943) – Small Boy (An Evacuee) (uncredited)
 Bell-Bottom George (1944) – Boy on Bicycle (uncredited)
 Champagne Charlie (1944) – 'Orace
 Give Us the Moon (1944) – Bellboy (uncredited)
 Don't Take It to Heart (1944) – Telegraph Boy
 Painted Boats  (1945) – His Brother Alf
 Hue and Cry (1947) – Joe Kirby
 Trouble in the Air (1948) – (uncredited)
 A Piece of Cake (1948) – Head Spiv
 For Them That Trespass (1949) – Dave, Rosie's friend
 Now Barabbas (1949) – Smith
 Landfall (1949) – RAF Corporal Orderly (uncredited)
 Dance Hall (1950) – Amorous Youth (uncredited)
 Once a Sinner (1950) – Bill James
 Trio (1950) – Undetermined Secondary Role (uncredited)
 She Shall Have Murder (1950) – Albert Oates
 The Dark Man (1951) – 1st Reporter
 Mister Drake's Duck (1951) – Corporal
 Scarlet Thread (1951) – Sam
 There Is Another Sun (1951) – Young Rider
 Madame Louise (1951) – Trout's Clerk
 High Treason (1951) – Street Photographer (uncredited)
 The Promise (1952)
 The Last Page (1952) – Joe
 13 East Street (1952) – (uncredited)
 I Believe in You (1952) – Hooker
 Angels One Five (1952) – Airman
 The Pickwick Papers (1952) – Sam Weller
 Top of the Form (1953) – Albert
 A Day to Remember (1953) – Stan Harvey
 Don't Blame the Stork (1954) – Harry Fenn
 Conflict of Wings (1954) – Leading Aircraftman 'Buster'
 Up to His Neck (1954) – Smudge
 Stock Car (1955) – Monty Albright
 The Blue Peter (1955) – Charlie Barton
 Fire Maidens from Outer Space (1956) – Sydney Stanhope
 Behind the Headlines (1956) – Alfie
 Home and Away (1956) – Syd Jarvis
 Town on Trial (1957) – Leslie (Bandleader)
 West of Suez (1957) – Tommy
 Booby Trap (1957) – Sammy
 Lucky Jim (1957) – Cab Driver (uncredited)
 The Birthday Present (1957) – Charlie
 The Supreme Secret (1958) – Bluey
 Soapbox Derby (1958) – Barrow Boy
 The Diplomatic Corpse (1958) – Knocker Parsons
 I Was Monty's Double (1958) – Civilian (End Scene)
 Idol on Parade (1959) – Ron
 The Heart of a Man (1959) – Razor
 The Dawn Killer (1959) – Bert Iron
 Don't Panic Chaps! (1959) – Ackroyd
 Crooks Anonymous (1962) – Woods
 Flight from Singapore (1962) – Sgt. Brooks
 The Longest Day (1962) – British Paratrooper (uncredited)
 Lawrence of Arabia (1962) – William Potter (uncredited)
 Tomorrow at Ten (1962) – Smiley
 Ladies Who Do (1963) – Drill Operator
 Seventy Deadly Pills (1964) – Covent Garden porter
 Father Came Too! (1964)
 Clash by Night (1964) – Doug Roberts
 The Nanny (1965) – Milkman
 Life at the Top (1965) – Magic Beans Man
 Doctor in Clover (1966) – Grafton
 Secrets of a Windmill Girl (1966) – Harry
 Start the Revolution Without Me (1970) – Marcel
 Crossed Swords (1977) – Nipper
 High Rise Donkey (1980) – Crook
 Sir Henry at Rawlinson End (1980) – Buller Bullethead
 George and Mildred (1980) – Fisher
 Fanny Hill (1983) – Beggar (uncredited)
 Body Contact (1987) – Herbert
 Chicago Joe and the Showgirl (1990) – Morry

Selected TV appearances
Dial 999 (TV series) (1959) - ('Barge Burglars', episode) - Sandy Gordon
The Army Game (1959–1960) – Cpl. 'Flogger' Hoskins
'Gideons Way' 1964
Dixon of Dock Green (1963–1970) – Duncan / Billy Reynolds / Alf Stubbings / Handbag Wilson
Z-Cars (1963–1972) – Billy Carrick / Tony / Toff
Jackanory (1969–1971) – Storyteller
Going A Bundle (1976) – Himself
Minder (1982) – Monty Wiseman
In Sickness and in Health (1985–1992) – Harry / Milkman 
Casualty (1986–1992) – George / Terry
Super Gran (1987) – Sid Scoundrel
Doctor Who: Remembrance of the Daleks (1988) – Harry
The Bill (1989–1992) – Alfred Sheldon / Pat Fitzgerald
The Impressionable Jon Culshaw (2004) – Customer (final appearance)

References

External links

1926 births
2012 deaths
English male film actors
English male television actors
Members of the Order of the British Empire
People from Lambeth
Royal Air Force personnel of World War II
Royal Air Force airmen